The 1991–92 NBA season was the Spurs' 16th season in the National Basketball Association, and 25th season as a franchise. During the off-season, the Spurs acquired Antoine Carr from the Sacramento Kings, then signed free agent Vinnie Johnson in December. After a 10–3 start to the season, the Spurs struggled with mediocrity holding a 21–17 record in late January, as head coach Larry Brown was fired, and soon took a coaching job with the Los Angeles Clippers. At midseason, the team signed three-point specialist Trent Tucker. Under replacement, interim and General Manager Bob Bass, the Spurs held a 27–19 record at the All-Star break, finishing second in the Midwest Division with a 47–35 record. 

David Robinson averaged 23.2 points, 12.2 rebounds, 2.3 steals and 4.5 blocks per game, and was named Defensive Player of the Year, and made the All-NBA First Team, the NBA All-Defensive First Team, and was selected for the 1992 NBA All-Star Game. He also finished in third place in Most Valuable Player voting behind Michael Jordan and Clyde Drexler. In addition, Terry Cummings averaged 17.3 points and 9.0 rebounds per game, while Sean Elliott provided the team with 16.3 points and 5.4 rebounds per game, Rod Strickland provided with 13.8 points, 8.6 assists and 2.1 steals per game, Willie Anderson contributed 13.1 points and 5.3 assists per game, and Carr averaged 10.9 points per game.

However, in March, Robinson went down with a thumb injury, and would not be available for the postseason. Without their star center, the Spurs were swept in three straight games in the Western Conference First Round of the playoffs to the Phoenix Suns. Following the season, Strickland signed as a free agent with the Portland Trail Blazers, while Bass was fired as head coach, and Johnson retired.

Draft picks

Roster

Regular season

Season standings

y - clinched division title
x - clinched playoff spot

z - clinched division title
y - clinched division title
x - clinched playoff spot

Record vs. opponents

Game log

Playoffs

|- align="center" bgcolor="#ffcccc"
| 1
| April 24
| @ Phoenix
| L 111–117
| Terry Cummings (30)
| Terry Cummings (12)
| Rod Strickland (9)
| Arizona Veterans Memorial Coliseum14,496
| 0–1
|- align="center" bgcolor="#ffcccc"
| 2
| April 26
| @ Phoenix
| L 107–119
| Terry Cummings (31)
| Terry Cummings (10)
| Rod Strickland (10)
| Arizona Veterans Memorial Coliseum14,496
| 0–2
|- align="center" bgcolor="#ffcccc"
| 3
| April 29
| Phoenix
| L 92–101
| Antoine Carr (20)
| Cummings, Carr (12)
| three players tied (5)
| HemisFair Arena14,853
| 0–3
|-

Player statistics

Season

Playoffs

Awards and records
David Robinson, NBA All-Star
David Robinson, NBA Defensive Player of the Year Award
David Robinson, All-NBA First Team
David Robinson, NBA All-Defensive First Team

Transactions

References

See also
1991-92 NBA season

San Antonio Spurs seasons
San Antonio
San Antonio
San Antonio